Alexis Alfonso Velela (born April 17, 1998) is an American soccer player for San Diego 1904 FC in the National Independent Soccer Association.

Youth
Velela was born in San Diego, California and played with his local side San Diego Surf.

Professional

New York Cosmos
Velela signed with North American Soccer League side New York Cosmos on August 10, 2015.

Motril CF (loan)
On August 27, 2017, Velela went out on loan to Spanish Tercera División side CF Motril until December 31, 2017.

References

External links
 New York Cosmos bio

1998 births
Living people
American soccer players
New York Cosmos (2010) players
New York Cosmos B players
Motril CF players
Association football defenders
Soccer players from San Diego
North American Soccer League players
American expatriate soccer players
American expatriate sportspeople in Spain
Expatriate footballers in Spain
National Premier Soccer League players
National Independent Soccer Association players
Tercera División players